The 1972 NCAA University Division baseball season, play of college baseball in the United States organized by the National Collegiate Athletic Association (NCAA) began in the spring of 1972.  The season progressed through the regular season and concluded with the 1972 College World Series.  The College World Series, held for the twenty sixth time in 1972, consisted of one team from each of eight geographical districts and was held in Omaha, Nebraska at Johnny Rosenblatt Stadium as a double-elimination tournament.  Southern California claimed the championship for the third year in a row, en route to five consecutive titles.

Conference winners
This is a partial list of conference champions from the 1972 season.  Each of the eight geographical districts chose, by various methods, the team that would represent them in the NCAA Tournament.  13 teams earned automatic bids by winning their conference championship while 15 teams earned at-large selections.

Conference standings
The following is an incomplete list of conference standings:

College World Series

The 1972 season marked the twenty sixth NCAA Baseball Tournament, which culminated with the eight team College World Series.  The College World Series was held in Omaha, Nebraska.  The eight teams played a double-elimination format, with Southern California claiming their eighth championship, and third in a row, with a 1–0 win over Arizona State in the final.

Award winners

All-America team

References